Arthur Henry Howe Browne  (16 October 1881 – 8 September 1961) was Bishop of Bloemfontein from 1935  to 1951. He was educated at Winchester and  Balliol, and ordained in 1906 after a period of study at Cuddesdon. He began his career  with curacies in Witney and East Dulwich. From 1909 to 1916 he was Vicar of  St John the Baptist, Kensington. From 1921-1934 he was vicar of St John the Divine Kennington and also Chaplain to St Gabriels College Camberwell During this time he was Rural Dean of Kennington and a Canon of Southwark until his appointment to the  Episcopate. After retirement he lived in Rondebosch until his death.

He was consecrated a bishop on 28 January 1935, by Francis Phelps, Archbishop of Cape Town, at St. George's Cathedral, Cape Town.

References

1881 births
People educated at Winchester College
Alumni of Balliol College, Oxford
Alumni of Ripon College Cuddesdon
20th-century Anglican Church of Southern Africa bishops
Anglican bishops of Bloemfontein
1961 deaths